Smolarz may refer to:
 Smolarz, Lubusz Voivodeship, a village in western Poland
 Henryk Smolarz (born 1969), a Polish politician

See also 

 Smolarze
 Smolarek